Daniel Mangrané (8 March 1910 – 27 December 1985) was a Spanish film producer, screenwriter and film director.

Selected filmography
 Rumbo (1949 - produced)
 La Virgen gitana (1951 - produced)
 The Evil Forest (1951 - directed, produced)

External links

1910 births
1985 deaths
People from Tortosa
Spanish film producers
Spanish male writers
Male screenwriters
Spanish film directors
20th-century Spanish screenwriters
20th-century Spanish male writers